The tenth series of Ballando con le Stelle was broadcast from 4 October 2014 to 6 December 2014 on RAI 1 and was presented by Milly Carlucci with Paolo Belli and his Big Band.

Couples

Scoring chart

Bottom 3/4

Week 1

Call-out order
The table below lists the order in which the contestants' fates were revealed. The order of the safe couples doesn't reflect the viewer voting results.

 This couple came in first place with the judges.
 This couple came in last place with the judges.
 This couple came in last place with the judges and was eliminated.
 This couple came in first place with the judges and was eliminated.
 This couple was eliminated.
 This couple was voted back into the competition.
 This couple was voted back into the competition but then re-eliminated.
 This couple passed to the next round automatically.
 This couple won the competition.
 This couple came second in the competition.
 This couple came third in the competition.

10
2014 Italian television seasons